Georgetown Bagelry is a bagel bakery in the Washington, D.C. area, founded in 1981. Its first location was on M street downtown, and it is now located in Bethesda, Maryland. For several years, it was voted by the Washington City Paper as having the best bagels in the area. The company specializes in New York-style bagels which are made by boiling dough.

History

Founder
The founder of the Bagelry was Erik Koefoed. when he was 27 he dropped out of school at Cornell University and opened the Georgetown Bagelry. At that time there were only two bakeries in the Washington D.C. area. He decided to make  New York-style bagels. In Ithaca, New York he learned to make New York style bagels during the day and he studied music at night.

The business was not doing well in the late 1980s, and Mary Beall Adler took over the bakery and moved it to River Road. She has been the owner of the business Georgetown Bagelry since 1991. In 2014, Georgetown Bagelry was named to Mashable's List of "32 Small Businesses Killing it on Social". in 2013, Beall wrote a book about her experience running the company.

New York style bagels
The process for making this style of bagel involves putting them into a boiling kettle of water for approximately 15 to 40 seconds. There is a shiny glaze found in New York bagels and that comes from the boiling. The dough is prepared the night before so that the yeast will cause the dough to rise.

Bibliography

References

External links 
Official website

1981 establishments in Washington, D.C.
Ashkenazi Jewish culture in Maryland
Ashkenazi Jewish culture in Washington, D.C.
Bagel companies
Bakeries of the United States
Bethesda, Maryland
Companies established in 1981
Jews and Judaism in Montgomery County, Maryland
Restaurants in Washington, D.C.
Restaurants in Maryland